Light Blue may refer to:

Light blue, a variant of the color blue
 Light blue (web color)
 Light blue (RAL), a RAL color
"Light Blue", a song by Thelonious Monk on the 1958 jazz album Thelonious in Action
"Light Blue", a song by Snail Mail on the 2021 indie rock album Valentine
Light Blue Pour Homme, a men's fragrance 
Light Blue Sun, an album by Lili Haydn
Light Blue: Arthur Blythe Plays Thelonious Monk, an album by Arthur Blythe
MRT Light Blue Line, a planned mass rapid transit line to be built in Bangkok, Thailand

See also
Blue Light (disambiguation)